Kulalania is a monotypic genus of Kenyan araneomorph spiders in the family Phyxelididae containing the single species, Kulalania antiqua. It was first described by C. E. Griswold in 1990, and is only found in Kenya.

See also
 List of Phyxelididae species

References

Endemic fauna of Kenya
Monotypic Araneomorphae genera
Phyxelididae
Spiders of Africa